James B. Thomson (born December 30, 1965) is a Canadian former ice hockey player.

Selected 185th overall by the Washington Capitals in the 1984 NHL Entry Draft, Thomson also played for the Hartford Whalers, New Jersey Devils, Los Angeles Kings, Ottawa Senators, and Mighty Ducks of Anaheim. In total, Thomson played 115 regular season games, scoring 4 goals and 3 assists for 7 points and collecting 416 penalty minutes. He also played one playoff game for the Los Angeles Kings during the 1992–93 NHL season.

Jim Thomson is now the owner of a Junior “A” hockey Team, The Aurora Tigers. He is also a motivational speaker often invited to speak at schools across North America as part of his organization called Jim Thomson's "Dreams Do Come True". Thomson is also an ambassador, speaker and advisory board member for Your Life Counts.

Career statistics

External links

Official Website
Profile at hockeydraftcentral.com

1965 births
Living people
Baltimore Skipjacks players
Binghamton Whalers players
Canadian ice hockey right wingers
Hartford Whalers players
Ice hockey people from Edmonton
Los Angeles Kings players
Mighty Ducks of Anaheim players
New Haven Nighthawks players
New Jersey Devils players
Ottawa Senators players
Phoenix Roadrunners (IHL) players
Toronto Marlboros players
Utica Devils players
Washington Capitals draft picks
Washington Capitals players